Juneau is a center of media in Southeast Alaska. The following is a list of media outlets based in the city.

Print

Newspapers
The Juneau Empire is the city's primary newspaper, published six days a week. Other newspapers published in the city include:
Capital City Weekly, weekly
Whalesong, University of Alaska Southeast student newspaper, twice monthly

Radio
The following is a list of radio stations licensed to and/or broadcasting from Juneau.

AM

FM

Television
The Juneau television market encompasses all of Southeast Alaska. In its Fall 2013 ranking of television markets by population, Arbitron ranked the Juneau market 207th in the United States.

The following is a list of television stations that broadcast from and/or are licensed to Juneau.

References

Juneau
 Juneau